St. Joseph Basilica is a parish church in Webster, Massachusetts, founded in 1887 as the first Catholic parish designated for Polish immigrants in New England. Located in the Catholic Diocese of Worcester, it was raised to the dignity of a minor basilica in 1998 by Pope John Paul II.

Architecture 
St. Joseph Basilica is a neo-gothic structure designed by architect John W. Donohue, who was for many years the official architect of the Roman Catholic Diocese of Springfield, which at the time encompassed Webster and all of Worcester County.

See also 
 St. Joseph Parish, Webster

References
 The 150th Anniversary of Polish-American Pastoral Ministry, Webster, Massachusetts (September 11, 2005)

External links 
  Diocese of Worcester
 Official site of St Joseph Parish
 Polish Cathedral style
 Polish American

Basilica churches in Massachusetts
Religious organizations established in 1887
19th-century Roman Catholic church buildings in the United States
Roman Catholic Diocese of Worcester
Churches in Worcester County, Massachusetts
Roman Catholic churches completed in 1887
Polish-American culture in Massachusetts
1887 establishments in Massachusetts